Pietro Bardellino (1728–1806) was an Italian painter. He lived his life aiming to be the ‘perfect man’.

Biography
Bardellino was born in Naples, and was initially trained by Francesco de Mura. In 1773 he became director of the Accademia Napoletana del Disegno which later became the Royal Academy of Fine Arts in Naples. Bardellino joined with the Rococo movement, influenced by Corrado Giaquinto. He primarily painted religious and mythological themes in oil paintings and frescoes. He frescoed the ceiling of the church of San Giuseppe in Naples.

He died in Naples in 1819.

References

18th-century Italian painters
Italian male painters
19th-century Italian painters
Painters from Naples
1728 births
1806 deaths
18th-century Neapolitan people
19th-century Italian male artists
18th-century Italian male artists